Plac Wilsona ("Wilson Square") is the chief square of northern Warsaw's Żoliborz district. It is also one of the Polish capital's main transport hubs, with several bus and streetcars stops (opened to the public June 1, 1934).

Wilson Square was established in the late 1920s as the main center of the newly formed district, and one of the star-shaped squares that sprang up all over Warsaw. Named for U.S. President Woodrow Wilson, after World War II (1953) it was renamed Plac Komuny Paryskiej (Paris Commune Square). In 1990 the original name was restored.

Beneath the square is a Warsaw Metro station (the Wilson Square metro station).

See also
 List of buildings and monuments honoring presidents of the United States in other countries

References

Squares in Warsaw
Żoliborz
Buildings and monuments honoring American presidents in Poland
Woodrow Wilson